The 2002 New Zealand Grand Prix (officially known as the 2002 P&O Nedlloyd New Zealand Grand Prix) was an open wheel racing car race held at Teretonga Park, near Invercargill on 13 January 2002. The event served as the fourth round of the New Zealand Formula Ford Championship, and was won by Fabian Coulthard in dominant fashion. The podium was completed by the two Team USA Scholarship drivers, Bryan Sellers and A. J. Allmendinger.

This event also marked the first time the New Zealand Grand Prix was run using Formula Ford machinery.

Classification

Qualifying

Race

References

New Zealand Grand Prix
Grand Prix